Bull is a Grade II* listed sculpture by Robert Clatworthy, in Daneburry Avenue, Roehampton, London.

The sculpture is a 1961 version of his plaster figure from 1959.  It was commissioned by the London County Council at the behest of A. W. Cleeve Barr, one of the lead architects for the Alton Estate in Roehampton.

See also
 Charging Bull (New York City sculpture)

References

External links
 

Grade II* listed buildings in the London Borough of Wandsworth
Bronze sculptures in the United Kingdom
Outdoor sculptures in London
Expressionist works
Roehampton
1961 sculptures
Grade II* listed public art
Cattle in art
Animal sculptures in the United Kingdom